Deskova Vas is a small settlement in the hills above the left bank of the Kolpa River in the Municipality of Črnomelj in the White Carniola area of southeastern Slovenia. The area is part of the traditional region of Lower Carniola and is now included in the Southeast Slovenia Statistical Region.

References

External links

Deskova Vas on Geopedia

Populated places in the Municipality of Črnomelj